Lightspeed, (also known as Stan Lee's Lightspeed) is a 2006 superhero film directed by Don E. FauntLeRoy, starring Jason Connery in the title role. It also stars Nicole Eggert, Daniel Goddard, and Lee Majors.

Plot
The covert world of government Ghost Squad agent Daniel Leight (Jason Connery) comes crashing down when he gets critically injured in a building collapse triggered by the genetically mutated terrorist called Python (Daniel Goddard). But when Leight's radiation treatments are later sabotaged by Python, Leight discovers that he has the ability to move at hyper speeds, though only by risking potentially fatal metabolic damage.

Cast
 Jason Connery as Daniel Leight / Lightspeed
 Nicole Eggert as Beth Baker
 Daniel Goddard as Python / Edward Bartlett
 Lee Majors as Tanner
 Michael Flynn as Dr. Findlay
 K.C. Clyde as Tom Barcroft
 Scott Hanks as Brian Latham
 Kari Hawker as Young Nurse
 Joyce Cohen as Old Nurse
 James Jamison as Senator Paul Davis
 Charles Halford as General Haade
 Socorro Herrera as Com-Tech

External links

Lightspeed at Superheroes Lives

2006 television films
2006 films
American science fiction films
American superhero films
Syfy original films
Film superheroes
Works by Stan Lee
2006 science fiction films
Films directed by Don E. FauntLeRoy
2000s American films